Щ-213 (transliterated as Shch-213 or sometimes SC-213) was a Soviet Navy , Type X. She was built at the Sudostroytelnyi zavod imeny 61 kommunara in Mykolaiv, Ukrainian SSR, and entered service in October 1938 with the Soviet Black Sea fleet.

In October 1942, Shch-213 struck a sea mine and sank with all hands.

Service history

Secret orders 
Shch-213 had secret orders to sink all neutral and enemy shipping entering the Black Sea, to reduce the flow of strategic materials to Nazi Germany. On 23 February 1942 she had sunk the  Turkish schooner Çankaya west-north-west of the Bosphorus with gunfire.

Struma disaster 

Struma had left the Romanian port of Constanța in December 1941 carrying an estimated 781 Jewish refugees in an attempt to reach Mandatory Palestine.  Turkish authorities had detained Struma and her passengers in Istanbul for 10 weeks because hardly any of them had obtained visas to enter Palestine, and the British authorities insisted that under their policy for Jewish immigration to Palestine they would not permit the remainder to do so. Struma’s engine had failed when leaving Romania and again when approaching Turkey, and despite attempted repairs in Istanbul it was still inoperable.

Early on the morning of 24 February Shch-213, commanded by DM Denezhko, fired a single torpedo which quickly sank Struma. Many passengers were trapped below decks and drowned. Many others aboard survived the sinking and clung to pieces of wreckage, but for hours no rescue came and all but one of them died from drowning or hypothermia. The only survivor was a 19-year-old refugee called David Stoliar, who was rescued the next day by the crew of a Turkish rowing boat.

Initially it was believed a stray mine had sunk Struma, but in the 1960s the German historian Jürgen Rohwer established that SC-213 had done so.

Soviet authorities commended Shch-213s crew for sinking Struma:

Further action 
On 2 March 1942 Shch-213 fired a torpedo at an unidentified merchant vessel northeast of the Bosphorus but missed. The next day the submarine fired a torpedo at the Turkish sailing vessel Adana east-north-east of the Bosphorus but again missed her target.

On 14 October 1942, off the coast of Tulcea, Romania, a torpedo narrowly missed Kriegsmarine U-Jäger ("Submarine chaser") UJ-116. Shch-213 may have been the attacker. UJ-116 responded by firing depth charges. For many years it was believed that the Shch-213 was sunk in this confrontation. In fact Shch-213 struck a mine, whose detonation sank her with all hands lost.

Wreck 
Damage to the submarine was consistent with her having struck a mine. The explosion had destroyed her registration markings, so it had taken until 2010 to identify her.

References 

Shchuka-class submarines
Ships built in the Soviet Union
World War II submarines of the Soviet Union
Maritime incidents in October 1942
Lost submarines of the Soviet Union
1942 in the Soviet Union
1937 ships
Ships sunk by mines
World War II shipwrecks in the Black Sea
Warships lost in combat with all hands